Ahmed Al-Anzi (born 22 January 1999) is a Saudi Arabian professional footballer who plays as a midfielder for Najran on loan from Al-Faisaly.

Career 
Al-Anzi joined Al-Faisaly's youth team from Al-Alameen on 26 August 2017. On 26 October 2019, Al-Anzi made his professional debut for Al-Faisaly against Al-Taawoun in the Pro League, replacing Khaleem Hyland. On 30 January 2022, Al-Anzi joined Al-Adalah on loan. On 28 January 2023, Al-Anzi joined Najran on loan.

Career statistics

Club

Honours

Club
Al-Faisaly
King Cup: 2020–21

Al-Adalah
 First Division runner-up: 2021–22

References

External links 
 

1999 births
Living people
Saudi Arabian footballers
Al-Alameen Club players
Al-Faisaly FC players
Al-Adalah FC players
Najran SC players
Saudi Professional League players
Saudi First Division League players
Association football midfielders